Juan Atkins (born September 12, 1962), also known as Model 500 and Infiniti, is an American record producer and DJ from Detroit, Michigan. Mixmag has described him as "the original pioneer of Detroit techno." He has been a member of The Belleville Three, Cybotron, and Borderland.

Early life
Juan Atkins was born in Detroit, Michigan. His father is a concert promoter. At an early age, he played guitar and bass guitar in funk/garage bands with his friends. After his parents split, he moved to Belleville, Michigan. In junior high school, he met Derrick May and Kevin Saunderson. The three would later be known as The Belleville Three. At the age of 15, he bought his first synthesizer, a Korg MS-10.

Career
Juan Atkins formed Cybotron with Richard Davis in 1980. The duo's debut studio album, Enter, was released in 1983. Atkins and Davis split ways in 1985.

In 1985, Atkins founded the record label Metroplex. In that year, he started making solo records under the alias Model 500. As Model 500, he released Deep Space in 1995, Mind and Body in 1999, and Digital Solutions in 2015.

He is also one half of the duo Borderland along with Moritz von Oswald. The duo released Borderland in 2013 and Transport in 2016.

In 2015, to celebrate the 30th anniversary of Metroplex, Juan Atkins collaborated with VAVA Eyewear.

Style and influences
Juan Atkins has stated that George Clinton's bands Parliament and Funkadelic were important to his musical awakening. He grew up listening to The Electrifying Mojo's radio shows. He also acknowledged Kraftwerk as one of the influences on his music. Mixmag has described him as "the original pioneer of Detroit techno."

Discography

Studio albums
 3MB Featuring Magic Juan Atkins (1992) 
 Deep Space (1995) 
 Skynet (1998) 
 Mind and Body (1999) 
 The Berlin Sessions (2005)
 Borderland (2013) 
 Digital Solutions (2015) 
 Transport (2016) 
 Mind Merge LP (2017)

Compilation albums
 Classics (1993) 
 The Infiniti Collection (1996) 
 20 Years 1985 - 2005 (2005)

EPs
 The True Techno EP (1992) 
 The Future Sound EP (1993)

Singles
 "No UFO's" (1985) 
 "Night Drive" (1985) 
 "Testing 1-2" (1986) 
 "Play It Cool" (1986) 
 "Technicolor" (1986) 
 "It's Channel One" (1987) 
 "Sound of Stereo" (1987) 
 "Make Some Noise" (1987) 
 "Beat Track" (1987)
 "Interference" (1988) 
 "The Chase" (1989) 
 "Ocean to Ocean" (1990) 
 "Jazz Is the Teacher" (1993) 
 "I See the Light" (1993) 
 "Sonic Sunset" (1994) 
 "The Flow" (1995) 
 "Starlight" (1995) 
 "I Wanna Be There" (1996) 
 "Be Brave" (1998) 
 "Update" (2002) 
 "Outer Space" (2004) 
 "OFI" / "Huesca" (2010) 
 "Control" (2012) 
 "Riod" (2016)

Filmography

Feature films
 High Tech Soul (2006)

Short films
 Black to Techno (2019)

References

External links

 
 
 

1962 births
Living people
20th-century American musicians
21st-century American musicians
African-American DJs
American electronic musicians
American techno musicians
Detroit techno
DJs from Detroit
Electronic dance music DJs
20th-century African-American musicians
21st-century African-American musicians